Through the Keyhole is a British comedy panel game show created by the TV producer Kevin Sim and originally presented by Sir David Frost in the studio and Loyd Grossman on location. The location presenter goes around celebrities' houses and a panel of other celebrities in the studio try to guess who the famous homeowner is.

The show was originally produced by Yorkshire Television and was broadcast on ITV from 3 April 1987 to 1 May 1995, then on Sky 1 from 22 February to 23 December 1996 before moving to BBC One from 7 April 1997 to 2004 and its sister channel BBC Two from 26 February 2006 to 4 June 2008.

In 2013, the show was revived for ITV with Keith Lemon as the host. In February 2020, it was reported that the programme had been cancelled after six series.

History

Original series
Through the Keyhole originally started as a segment on TV-am, first being broadcast on its launch day on 1 February 1983. The idea was created by Kevin Sim as a chance to look around some of the most influential homes with Grossman at the helm as the tour presenter. Grossman was mistakenly given the job after someone had confused him with another journalist. It became a regular feature of TV-am throughout 1983.

In 1987, Frost transferred the concept to Yorkshire Television and produced a full half-hour programme for ITV, where a celebrity panel tries to guess whose house is being looked at. It ran in primetime on Friday nights for eight years on ITV and was rarely out of the top ten entertainment programmes on TV. The executive producers were Kevin Sim and Chantal Rickards. From 1996, it was produced by Frost's own production company, Paradine Productions, at Yorkshire Television. That same year, the show also moved to Sky 1 for one series. It then moved to BBC1 Daytime in 1997 until 2004. The final three series aired on BBC Two from 2006 to 2008, when it was finally cancelled by the BBC. However, a special aired in March 2011 for Red Nose Day 2011 as part of marathon panel show 24 Hour Panel People.

Revival

In 2013, the programme returned on its original broadcast channel ITV with Leigh Francis as Keith Lemon taking up the dual roles of studio presenter and house detective. The new series was filmed at Pinewood Studios until 2018, with series 6 filmed at the BBC Elstree Centre's Studio D in the latter half of the year. Dave Berry is a regular panellist. He appeared in all the episodes of the first series and has also made numerous appearances in subsequent series. Celebrity guests on the show are a closely guarded secret until transmission. The first episode of the revived series aired on the same day that former host Sir David Frost died, although the news did not break until the following morning.

Before his death in August 2013, Frost gave his backing to ITV's remake saying "I am delighted that the Keyhole format is now entering its fourth decade on TV. I know the pilot show went down very well with the studio audience and I wish Keith and his team the very best of luck for the series."

Format
At the start of each episode, Frost introduces a panel of three celebrities with the catchphrase "And what a panel they are ..." and some gently humorous or mocking descriptions. He then hands over to the location presenter who gives the panellists a guided tour of a property, noting particular items, though there is typically a large amount of misdirection involved as the items pointed out by the presenter are not necessarily the most pertinent clues to the person's identity. Items not specifically mentioned may provide much more useful clues. Once completed, Frost reveals the identity of the guest to the audience and the panel are given turns at guessing their identity. The audience participate with varying degrees of applause according to the accuracy of the panellists' guesswork.

The panellists are either successful at identifying the guest or Frost reveals their identity, after which they are interviewed and given a key-shaped trophy as a memento. Starting during Loyd Grossman's reign as location presenter, the geographic spread was extended with one of the properties on each episode being located in the US and one in Europe. When Stefanie Powers joined in 2007, she was based in the US and conducted the US property tours, whilst in the UK Lisa Snowdon conducted the European part.

Celebrity panellists and homeowners

ITV

Series 1

Series 2

Series 3

Series 4

Revival

Series 1

 Note: Episode 7 was a Christmas special.

Series 2

 Note: Episode 8 was a Christmas special

Series 3

 Note: Episode 8 was a Christmas special.

Series 4
A fourth series began airing on 7 January 2017, with a Christmas episode airing two weeks previously, on 24 December. Eight episodes were recorded at Pinewood Studios in July 2016.

 Note: Episode 1 was a Christmas special.

Series 5
A fifth series began airing on 13 January 2018. Prior to this, an I'm a Celebrity...Get Me Out of Here! special aired in December 2017 instead of a Christmas episode.

 Note: Episode 1 was an I'm a Celebrity special.

Series 6
A sixth series began airing on 12 January 2019. Prior to this, a Christmas special aired on 14 December 2018.

 Note: Episode 1 was a Christmas special.

Transmissions

ITV

Series

ITV Specials

Sky 1

BBC

ITV Revival

ITV Specials

International broadcast
In 2015, the Dutch SBS6 channel broadcast the Dutch version, called Met de deur in huis, hosted by Kees Tol. In this show, comedian Tineke Schouten visits the houses of Dutch celebrities. The panel (Maik de Boer, Patty Brard and Ruben van der Meer) have to guess whose house she is in. In 2016, a second series aired on SBS6.

References

External links

1987 British television series debuts
2019 British television series endings
1990s British television series
2000s British television series
1980s British game shows
1990s British game shows
2000s British game shows
2010s British game shows
BBC television game shows
ITV comedy
ITV game shows
ITV panel games
Sky UK original programming
Television series by Fremantle (company)
Television series by ITV Studios
Television series by Yorkshire Television
English-language television shows
British television series revived after cancellation
Television shows shot at BBC Elstree Centre